Clean Break is a 2008 American film starring Tara Reid, Angus Macfadyen, and Colm Meaney. It was released in a few European markets in 2008 and in the United States on July 3, 2012 (as a Video On Demand title) under the title Unnatural Causes.

Plot
Julia and Matt are the owners of a successful advertising agency in Barcelona. Apparently they are happily married, but Matt, a very talented professional but unstable person, is confident his wife is cheating on him. He has her followed and when he thinks his suspicions are confirmed, arranges her murder. Unable to stand his own guilt Matt commits suicide. Julia has survived the murder attempt but her life is still in danger in a world of where everything is possible for the rise to power.

Cast
Tara Reid - Julia McKay
Colm Meaney - Trevor Jones
Angus Macfadyen - Matt McKay
Francesc Garrido - Álvaro
Robert Galzarano - Bobby McKay
Lorena Bernal - Eva
Mingo Ràfols - Inspector Jiménez
George Wendt - Chuck
Marta Bayarri - Ana
Roger Delmont - Daniel
Ludovic Tattevin - Antonio
Sue Flack - Rose McKay
Anna Diogene - Notario Myalar
Joan Pico - Luis
Albert Riballo - Miguel

Reception
Monica Meijer, writing for CineMagazine, rated the film 1.5 stars.

References

External links
 
 

2008 films
2008 thriller films
American thriller drama films
2000s English-language films
2000s American films